Aleksandr Agafonov (born 22 April 1975) is an Uzbek former swimmer, who specialized in freestyle events. He is a three-time Olympian (1996, 2000, and 2004), a two-time swimmer at the Asian Games (2002 and 2006), and a former Uzbekistani age group record holder in the 100 and 200 m freestyle.

Agafonov made his official debut at the 1996 Summer Olympics in Atlanta, where he competed as a member of the Uzbekistan team in the 4 × 200 m freestyle relay. Teaming with Vyacheslav Kabanov, Dmitry Pankov, and Oleg Tsvetkovskiy, Agafonov swam the second leg in heat two with a split of 1:56.44, but the Uzbeks settled for fourth place and twelfth overall in a final time of 7:40.60.

At the 2000 Summer Olympics in Sydney, Agafonov competed as an individual swimmer in the 100 m freestyle. Swimming in heat three, he picked up a third seed and fifty-fourth overall by 0.36 of a second behind winner Paul Kutscher of Uruguay in 52.58.

Agafonov swam for his second time in the 100 m freestyle at the 2004 Summer Olympics in Athens. He achieved a FINA B-standard of 52.10 from the Russian Championships in Moscow. He challenged seven other swimmers in heat two, including 28-year-old Željko Panić of Bosnia and Herzegovina. He raced to fourth place by 0.17 of a second behind Panic in 52.92. Agafonov ended his third Olympic stint with a fifty-seventh-place effort in the preliminaries.

References

External links 
 

1975 births
Living people
Uzbekistani male freestyle swimmers
Olympic swimmers of Uzbekistan
Swimmers at the 1996 Summer Olympics
Swimmers at the 2000 Summer Olympics
Swimmers at the 2004 Summer Olympics
Asian Games medalists in swimming
Asian Games bronze medalists for Uzbekistan
Swimmers at the 1994 Asian Games
Swimmers at the 1998 Asian Games
Medalists at the 1994 Asian Games
Swimmers at the 2002 Asian Games
Sportspeople from Tashkent
21st-century Uzbekistani people